Sameer Hilal (born 1967) is a Saudi Arabian professional football manager and former player.

Career 
Born in Dammam, Hilal began his senior career at Al-Ettifaq in 1987 and spent 15 years at the club, winning 4 major titles with the club. He moved to Al-Khaleej in 2001 where he spent a season before retiring.

After retiring, Hilal was appointed as an assistant coach at Al-Khaleej in 2007. On 17 November 2008, he was appointed as a caretaker manager following the sacking of Samir Sellimi. He was then appointed as manager until the end of the 2008–09 season. Hilal then returned to Al-Ettifaq as an assistant manager, a position he held for two seasons. Following the sacking of Branko Ivanković, Hilal was named as caretaker manager for the second leg of King Cup tie against Al-Fateh. On 28 May 2013, Hilal was appointed as the manager of Al-Khaleej and led the club to promotion to the Pro League, after finishing as runner-up in the First Division. The following season, Hilal was appointed as the manager of Al-Nahda. He was sacked the following season after picking up just 2 points in the opening four matches. On 9 March 2016, Hilal was appointed as the manager of Al-Orobah until the end of the season. On 7 August 2016, Hilal was appointed as the manager of Hajer, but he was sacked after four months. On 29 May 2018, Hilal was appointed as Al-Khaleej's manager for the third time. They narrowly missed out on promotion after losing the play-offs to Al-Hazem on penalties. On 23 September 2020, Hilal returned to Al-Khaleej for the fourth time as a manager. On 22 July 2021, Hilal was appointed as Al-Nahda's manager.

Managerial statistics

Honours

Player
Al-Ettifaq
Saudi Premier League: 1986–87
Saudi Federation Cup: 1990–91
Arab Club Champions Cup: 1988
Gulf Club Champions Cup: 1988

Manager
Al-Khaleej
 Saudi First Division runner-up: 2013–14 (Promotion to Pro League)

References

1967 births
Date of birth missing (living people)
Living people
People from Dammam
Saudi Arabian footballers
Ettifaq FC players
Khaleej FC players
Saudi Professional League players
Saudi First Division League players
Association football midfielders
Saudi Arabian football managers
Saudi First Division League managers
Khaleej FC managers
Ettifaq FC managers
Al-Nahda Club (Saudi Arabia) managers